Dana Andrews is a singer/musician from Augusta, Georgia.  She was a top 15 finalist on the TV show Rockstar: Supernova.  Dana is currently living and working as a musician in Los Angeles, CA.

Biography

Early life
Born and raised in Augusta, GA, Dana found the stage early on. She sought out any avenue to showcase her talent from elementary to high school and beyond. Whether it was school plays, karaoke contests or community theater, Dana has always found the spotlight. At thirteen, she began creating her own original material and devised a mission to find the musicians to complete her sound.

Career
Dana joined The Tony Howard Show & Band (a top forty cover band) singing backup and lead at nineteen to hone her vocal skills.  Shortly thereafter she cut her first demo. She traveled to several syndicated radio stations in the southeast to promote her own music, and eventually was contacted by an established original band based out of Columbia, SC, Everything After. Shortly after officially joining the band in early 2006, Dana auditioned for CBS's Rockstar:Supernova. Out of nine countries and over 25,000 artists auditioning, she made the final 16 for the international television show and made her way to Hollywood to be on television. 
     
Dana lasted 6 weeks on the show. The band Supernova consisted of Gilby Clarke, Jason Newsted, and Tommy Lee.  The show was hosted by Dave Navarro and Brooke Burke. 
      
After being released from the competition, Dana went back home to the South East. The mayor of her hometown, Deke Copenhaver, personally awarded her with a plaque stating that August 12, 2006 was Dana Andrews Day. Soon Dana reunited with her band, Everything After, in South Carolina. Within one month, the group had recorded and publicized two songs that were played on radio stations such as WARQ, WXRY and WCHZ. They performed with acts like 7 Mary 3, Decyfer Down, Black Stone Cherry, Drivin n Cryin, Hanson, Crossfade, and Buck Cherry and developed a steady following.  
     
In 2009, Dana relocated to Los Angeles, recording with several different projects of various genres. Currently, Dana is a member of the blues infused rock band, Uniform Standard. They've performed at The Viper Room and the House of Blues on the Sunset Strip in Los Angeles, CA.  Their first album, "Uniform Standard," will be released on March 29.

References

External links
 Uniform Standard Website 

Living people
Musicians from Augusta, Georgia
Rockstar: Supernova contestants
Year of birth missing (living people)